John P Brown (born 1888) was an English footballer who played for Manchester City and Stoke.

Career
Brown was born in Liverpool and played for Orrell before joining Manchester City in 1908. He played six times for Man City before joining Stoke in 1910. Brown played 15 matches for Stoke during the 1910–11 season scoring seven goals.

Career statistics
Source:

References

English footballers
Manchester City F.C. players
Stoke City F.C. players
English Football League players
1888 births
Year of death missing
Association football outside forwards